George Peter Hammond (September 19, 1896 – December 3, 1993) was an American professor of Latin American studies. He published works related to the founding of New Mexico and other Spanish settlements in the United States. He was the director of the Bancroft Library at the University of California, Berkeley for 17 years.

Early life and education
Hammond was born on September 19, 1896 in Hutchinson, Minnesota, the son of Danish immigrants Niels Peter Jensen Hammond (né Haumann) and his wife Christiane (née Svendsen). When he was 13 years old, his family moved to California. He attended the University of California, Berkeley in the fall of 1916, graduating in 1920 as a history major under Herbert E. Bolton. Hammond received a M.A. in 1921.

Hammond married Carrie Nelson, who was also of Danish ancestry, in 1921 while studying for his Ph.D. Hammond traveled to Spain for a year in the summer of 1922 through a graduate program at UC Berkeley. He received his doctorate in 1924.

Teaching career
Hammond began his career as an American history professor at the University of North Dakota in 1923, where he began collaborating with Agapito Rey, a Spanish professor. They worked on translations from Spanish documents about the history and settlement of the Southwest. In 1925, Hammond became an associate professor of history at the University of Arizona. Two years later, he was invited to Los Angeles by the president of the University of Southern California. In Los Angeles, Hammond revised his doctoral thesis on Don Juan de Oñate and the founding of New Mexico, clarifying the Oñate's contract for establishing a colony in New Mexico, and adding more information about the desertion of the colony. In 1935, Hammond became a professor of history, head of the department, and dean of the Graduate School at the University of New Mexico, where he worked to improve relations between the university and New Mexico.

Director of Bancroft Library
As a student at UC Berkeley, Hammond had worked as a student employee in the Bancroft library. In 1946, Hammond was appointed director of the Bancroft Library, which he helped develop from a small library primarily for scholars into a modern research library. During his time as director, he added to the library collections, expanded staff and specialists, and obtained new resources for the library. Hammond's contributions to the library included the purchase of a collection of Robert D. Honeymoon's paintings and original drawings. Hammond also edited a manuscript by Thomas O. Larkin, printed as The Larkin Papers. He retired in 1965, but continued his research and maintained a position at the Bancroft Library.

Achievements
Hammond helped found the Pacific Historical Review and served on its first board of editors. He was also a member of the historical records survey of New Mexico. He served as the state director for New Mexico Historical Records Survey, W.P.A., from 1936 to 1939. He was a member of the U.S. delegation to the 4th Assembly of the Pan-American Institute of Geography and History at Caracas in 1946. Hammond was part of the Friends of Bancroft Library in the California Historical Society. He received an honorary degree of Doctor of Laws from the University of New Mexico in 1954. In 1950 he was elected chair of the Conference on Latin American History, the professional organization of Latin American historians.

Hammond had a dark side. George Hammond likely took part in two historical hoaxes: the Drake Plate of Brass, and the Chowan River Dare Stone. Several lines of evidence point to historian Herbert E. Bolton as the perpetrator of these hoaxes, and Hammond assisted. Hammond was an accomplice in the Chowan River Dare Stone hoax, as he posed as LE Hammond and brought the stone to Emory University as evidenced by handwriting analysis that matches his signature with that of the alleged fruit dealer. Bolton was Hammond's mentor and advisor at Berkeley. Bolton was an influential professor at University of California at Berkeley. He was also the director of the Bancroft Library. Hammond later he succeeded Bolton as director of the Bancroft Library.

We may never know why Hammond risked his reputation to take part in these hoaxes. Drake’s Plate of Brass served to promote an English hero and stressed a white national identity of America; as did the Chowan River Dare stone and its alleged association with Eleanor Dare, a colonist from Raleigh’s Lost Colony. The plate and the stone became potent symbols of America’s English heritage and the founding of America, and they underscored the ideology of white manifest destiny and the conviction that God destined whites to populate North America. These alleged artifacts were used by the historians involved in these hoaxes to promote much of the fabled narrative that fostered and furthered their racist ethos, and that of their White supporters.

Works
Don Juan de Oñate and the Founding of New Mexico (1927).
The Story of New Mexico: Its History and Government (1936). University of New Mexico Press.
The Adventure of Don Francisco Vasquez de Coronado (1938). University of New Mexico.  
The Larkin Papers: Personal, Business, and Official Correspondence of Thomas Oliver Larkin, Merchant and United States Consul in California (1964). University of California Press.
A Guide to the Manuscript Collections: Manuscripts Relating Chiefly to Mexico and Central America (1972). Bancroft Library. 
The Adventure of Alexander Barclay, Mountain Man (1976). Old West Publishing Company. 
The Search for the Fabulous in the Settlement of the West. Utah State Historical Society.

References

External links
George P. Hammond general correspondence and papers at L. Tom Perry Special Collections, Harold B. Lee Library, Brigham Young University

1896 births
1993 deaths
People from Hutchinson, Minnesota
University of California, Berkeley alumni
University of California, Berkeley faculty
University of New Mexico faculty
Writers from California
Writers from Minnesota
20th-century American historians
American male non-fiction writers
University of Arizona faculty
University of North Dakota faculty
Harold B. Lee Library-related 20th century articles
Historians from California
20th-century American male writers